Finder of Lost Loves is an American drama series aired by the ABC network during the 1984–1985 season.

Synopsis
After Cary Maxwell's (Anthony Franciosa) wife Kate dies, he decides to set up a private detective agency specializing in reuniting clients with a former loved one. The leading cast members were Franciosa, Deborah Adair, Anne Jeffreys, Richard Kantor, and Larry "Flash" Jenkins. Similar to The Love Boat (another Aaron Spelling production), the series featured various weekly guest stars. The series was canceled after 23 episodes.

The series' theme song, "Finder of Lost Loves", was performed by Dionne Warwick and Luther Vandross and written by Burt Bacharach and Carole Bayer Sager. It was an Adult Contemporary chart hit in 1985. The TV version was sung by Dionne Warwick and Luther Vandross.

Cast
 Anthony Franciosa as Cary Maxwell
 Deborah Adair as Daisy Lloyd
 Anne Jeffreys as Rita Hargrove
 Larry "Flash" Jenkins as Lyman Whittaker
 Richard Kantor as Brian Fletcher

Guest stars

 Melissa Sue Anderson
 Mackenzie Astin
 Lew Ayres
 Patricia Barry
 Christine Belford
 Pamela Bellwood
 Susan Blakely
 Tom Bosley
 Macdonald Carey
 Jack Coleman
 Cathy Lee Crosby
 Mary Crosby
 Colleen Dewhurst
 Joyce DeWitt
 Buddy Ebsen
 Samantha Eggar
 Mel Ferrer
 Anne Francis
 Beverly Garland
 Harold Gould
 Robert Goulet
 Michael Gross
 Florence Henderson
 Bo Hopkins
 John James
 Lance Kerwin
 Kim Lankford
 Hope Lange 
 Kay Lenz
 Carol Lynley 
 Kevin McCarthy
 Leigh McCloskey
 Lee Meriwether
 Vera Miles
 Michael Nader
 Leslie Nielsen
 Lois Nettleton
 Heather O'Rourke
 Barret Oliver
 Donna Pescow
 Paul Peterson
 Michelle Phillips
 Lindsay Price
 Robert Reed
 Tony Roberts
 Esther Rolle
 Dick Sargent
 Peter Scolari
 Connie Sellecca
 Ted Shackelford
 Jan Smithers
 Vic Tayback
 Lauren Tewes
 Gordon Thomson
 Dick Van Patten
 Dee Wallace
 Marcia Wallace
 Cassie Yates

Episodes

References

External links
 
 Finder of Lost Loves on the Web

1980s American drama television series
1984 American television series debuts
1985 American television series endings
American Broadcasting Company original programming
Television series by CBS Studios
Television series by Spelling Television
English-language television shows
Television shows set in New York City